Vardges Petrosyan (August 9, 1932 – April 15, 1994) was an Armenian writer of fiction and drama.

Vardges Petrosyan, a prominent novelist, playwright and essayist was born in 1932 in the town of Ashtarak, where he spent his childhood years, finished school and began writing his first verses.

In 1954, he graduated from the Yerevan University and started writing for several youth newspapers. As a newspaper correspondent he travelled all over his native Armenia and throughout the entire Soviet Union—from 'Yakutia in Eastern Siberia to Karelia in the northwest of the country.

His first collection of poems, "The Ballad About Man", came out in 1958, to be followed by collections of essays, feature stories and tales.

Vardges Petrosyan is best known for his novels "The Last Teacher", "Letters from the Small Stations of Childhood", "The Ani Drugstore", "The Armenian Sketches" and also for his play "The Heavy Weight of Hippocrates' Hat". Petrosyan is a winner of the Armenian Republic's State Prize and Komsomol Prize.

In 1966, he became the editor-in-chief of an Armenian youth monthly "Garun" (Spring) where he worked till 1975 when he was elected the First Secretary of the Board of Writers' Union of Armenia.

Among his published books (in Armenian) that are found in US libraries according to WorldCat are:
 Petrosyan, Vardges. Storagrutʻyan pativě. Haykakan ēskʻizner—Vardges Petrosyan" himnadram, Matenashar, tʻiv 1. Erevan: "Van Aryan", 2000. 
 Petrosyan, Vardges. Ěntir erker: erku hatorov. Erevan: "Sovetakan Grogh" Hratarakchʻutʻyun, 1983.

One story only has been translated into English, as "The solitary hazel tree" by Vardges Petrosyan in Soviet literature. no. 5 (422) (1983) 

Petrosyan was shot dead on 15 April 1994 near the entrance to his house in Yerevan. In 2000, the school No. 51 of Yerevan was named after Vardges Petrosyan.

General references
Antonyan, Suren. Vardges Petrosyaně im husherum. [Erevan]: [s.n.], 1997. 	[Erevan] : [s.n.], 1997. OCLC: 44174342
Chʻekʻelezyan, E. H., S. K. Chagharyan, and S. A. Babayan. Vardges Petrosyan: (kensamatenagitakan tsʻank). Erevan: HSSH Al. Myasnikyani anvan Petakan Gradaran, 1987. OCLC 26449223

1932 births
1994 deaths
People from Ashtarak
Armenian male novelists
Armenian male writers
20th-century Armenian novelists
Writers from Ashtarak
20th-century male writers
Soviet novelists
Soviet male writers
People murdered in Armenia
Armenian murder victims
Deaths by firearm in Armenia
1990s murders in Armenia
1994 crimes in Armenia
1994 murders in Asia
1994 murders in Europe